The white blackberry is an unusual white variety of blackberry developed by plant breeder Luther Burbank, also known as the iceberg white blackberry or snowbank berry, probably originating as a pun on the name "Burbank". 

He originally found a wild pale coloured blackberry in New Jersey, named 'Crystal White'. He then mixed that berry with the Lawton blackberry, and then other pale berries. Burbank had tried out 65,000 unsuccessful crossbreeds, at his facility in Santa Rosa, California, before achieving success in 1894.

References

External links
 Site of Luther Burbank's home & Greenhouse Mr. Burbank's white blackberry is still propagated here today
 Baker Creek Seeds The white blackberry is available for purchase from rareseeds.com as of 2018, although it is often out of stock due to high demand. Previously it was required to travel to Mr. Burbank's old home to get this variety. 

Hybrid Rubus